Mala Sinha is a former Indian actress who has worked in Hindi, Bengali and Nepali films. Initially starting her career with regional cinema, she went on to become an actress in Hindi Cinema in the late 1950s, 1960s and early 1970s. In a career spanning four decades, Mala Sinha rose to prominence with films like Guru Dutt's Pyaasa (1957) and Yash Chopra's Dhool Ka Phool (1959). Later, she starred in over hundred film productions including Phir Subah Hogi (1958), Hariyali Aur Rasta, Anpadh (both 1962), Dil Tera Deewana (1962), Gumrah, Bahurani (both 1963), Jahan Ara (1964), Himalay Ki God Mein (1965), Ankhen, Do Kaliyaan (both 1968) and Maryada (1971) . She was known as the "daring diva" and "torch bearer of women's cinema" for essaying strong female centric and unconventional roles in a range of movies considered ahead of her times. Having received multiple awards and nominations, she was given the Filmfare Lifetime Achievement Award in 2018.

Mala Sinha was constantly paired in roles opposite Uttam Kumar, Kishore Kumar, Dev Anand, Dharmendra, Raaj Kumar, Rajendra Kumar, Biswajeet, Manoj Kumar and Rajesh Khanna. She was the highest-paid actress from 1958 to 1965 with Vyjayanthimala, and second with Vyjayanthimala from 1966 to 1967, and then shared the second spot with Sharmila Tagore from 1968 to 1971, and third position with Sadhana and Nanda in 1972–73.

Filmography

Hindi films

Bengali films 
Out of 22 Bengali films acted by Mala Sinha, 7 films are paired opposite Mahanayak Uttam Kumar.

Nepali film 
 Maitighar (1966) (Chidambar Prasad Lohani)

References

Sinha, Mala
Sinha, Mala